"Apocalypso (Wiping the Smile Off Santa's Face)" is a Christmas song by Australian band Mental As Anything, released in November 1984. The song reached at number 37 on the Kent Music Report.

Track listing

Personnel 

 Martin Plaza – lead vocals, guitar
 Wayne de Lisle – drums
 Reg Mombassa – guitar, vocals
 Greedy Smith – lead vocals, keyboards, harmonica
 Peter O'Doherty – bass guitar, vocals

Charts

References 

Mental As Anything songs
1984 songs
1984 singles
Songs written by Martin Plaza
Songs written by Reg Mombassa
Songs about Santa Claus
Christmas songs
Regular Records singles
CBS Records singles
Warner Music Group singles
Song recordings produced by Mark Opitz